An inclined plane is a type of cable railway used on some canals for raising boats between different water levels. Boats may be conveyed afloat, in caissons, or may be carried in cradles or slings.

History
Inclined planes have evolved over the centuries. Some of the first were used by the Egyptians to bypass waterfalls on the Nile. These consisted of wooden slides covered with silt which reduced friction.

Timeline
600BC – The Diolkos, an early Greek inclined plane, was in use.
385AD – Inclined planes were in use on the Grand Canal in China.
1167 – Nieuwedamme overtoom (a simple type of incline) was built at Ypres.
1568 – Wagon of Zafosina in use near Venice.
1777 – 3 inclined planes or 'dry wherries' began operation on Dukart's Canal, near Coalisland, in the south-east of County Tyrone in Ulster. 
1788 – An inclined plane was built by William Reynolds and used, for the first time in England, to raise canal boats on England's Ketley Canal.
1792 – William Reynolds of Ketley Ironworks constructed several inclined planes on the Shropshire Canal.
1792 - 1921 – In 1792 the Shropshire Tub Canals were built incorporating a number of inclined planes. One of these, the Trench plane closed in 1921 and brought to an end boat-carrying inclined planes in Britain
1797 - 1822 – At Worsley Navigable Levels, a coal mine operation in Greater Manchester, England, an underground incline started in 1795 was completed in 1797.
1800  – Francis Henry Egerton (1756-1829), who became The 8th Earl of Bridgewater in 1823, wrote  'The Description of the Inclined Plane at Walkden Moor. (Lancashire)
1806 - 1828 Two inclined planes built on the Stollen Canal at Gliwice, Upper Silesia.

 1831 - 1924 – Between 1825 and 1831, 23 inclines were built as part of the Morris Canal, New Jersey, USA. In 1832, Frances Trollope, publishes in "Domestic Manners of the Americans" her account of a visit the previous year to see one of the inclined planes of the Morris Canal. In 1924 the canal was abandoned and later dismantled. The Morris Canal's design was reused for the planes on the Elbląg Canal. (see below) 
1837 - 1865 – The extension to the Kidwelly and Llanelly Canal, Wales opened in 1837, including two counterbalanced inclined planes and one single-track one. 
1849 - 1942 – Inclined plane built on the Monkland Canal near Blackhill, Scotland to supplement existing locks.
1860–present – The first four inclined planes of the Elbląg Canal in Germany (East Prussia), nowadays Poland, were opened in 1860. A fifth incline was added later to replace five wooden locks. This canal reused the design from the Morris Canal for its inclined planes. 

 1900 - 1926 – Foxton Inclined Plane was built in England to help overcome shortcomings of the Foxton locks on the Grand Union Canal. Mothballed in 1911 and seeing only occasional use and dismantled in 1926.
1969–present  – In 1969 the Saint-Louis-Arzviller inclined plane replaced a ladder of seventeen locks over a distance of four kilometers on the Marne-Rhine Canal in France.

Other examples

With caissons
This is an electric rack railway.

Without caissons
 Morris Canal, Northern New Jersey

See also

 Boat lift
 Cable car (railway)
 Cable railway
 Funicular
 Inclined plane – the simple machine
 Lock (water transport)
 Patent slip
 Portage
 Stairlift
 Water slope

References

Further reading

External links

 Article on the C & O incline plane
 Photo of St Louis-Arzviller inclined plane, Canal de La Marne au Rhin, Alsace-Lorraine, France
 Second photo of St Louis-Arzviller inclined plane
 The inclined plane of Ronquières (official site)
 Ronquières Inclined Plane
 Photos of Ronquières inclined plane
 Krasnoyarsk hydroelectric dam boat lift — photograph gallery showing all stages of ship elevation
 Funicular railways of the UK – Mainly concerning Funiculars but with a good section on canal inclined planes
 Overtoom – Dutch Overtoom page
 Avenhorn Overhaal

Railway inclines
Vertical transport devices